Betül Nur Yılmaz is a Turkish woman football referee and school teacher. She is a FIFA listed woman assistant referee.

Yılmaz started her officiating career as an assistant referee in the Amateur league for boys in 2009. She served at this position in almost all amateur league. From 2010 on, she takes the assistant referee role in Women's Third and First League matches. On 25 September 2012, she debuted  in a match of U15 boys teams as referee.

Yılmaz was named FIFA listed woman assistant referee for 2016, and continued to bear this title in 2017. She debuted in this role at the 2017–18 UEFA Women's Champions League qualifying round match between ŽNK Osijek and ŽFK Istatov on 22 August 2017. She assisted her countrywoman referee Melis Özçiğdem at the 2019 FIFA Women's World Cup qualification – UEFA Group 4 match between Sweden and Hungary on 24 October 2017, and Group 7 match between Finland and Israel on 26 November 2017.

Yılmaz kept her FIFA-badge for 2018. She served as assistant referee alongside Turkish Melis Özçiğdem at the 2018–19 UEFA Women's Champions League - Round of 32 match between AFC Ajax and AC Sparta Praha on 12 September 2018. She was assistant to her countrywoman referee Neslihan Muratdağı in three matches at the 2019 UEFA Women's Under-17 Championship qualification – Group 8 matches in September 2018.

References

External links 

 
 
 

Living people
Turkish schoolteachers
Turkish football referees
Turkish women referees and umpires
Women association football referees
Year of birth missing (living people)